is a Japanese professional baseball player. He played two seasons with Hokkaido Nippon Ham Fighters in 2013 and 2014. He was born on December 14, 1987. He debuted in 2013. He had 24 strikeouts.

References

Living people
1987 births
Japanese baseball players
Nippon Professional Baseball pitchers
Hokkaido Nippon-Ham Fighters players